1995 heatwave may refer to:

 1995 Chicago heat wave (July)
 1995 United Kingdom heat wave (July–August)